The Absent One, also known as Department Q: The Absent One, is a 2014 Danish crime mystery film directed by  and co-written by Nikolaj Arcel and Rasmus Heisterberg, based on Jussi Adler-Olsen's novel of the same name. It is the second film in the Department Q series following the 2013 film The Keeper of Lost Causes, and preceding the 2016 film A Conspiracy of Faith.

Plot
The story centers around the murder of twins in 1994, one of whom was also raped. At first unwilling to get involved in the case, Mørck changes his mind after their father commits suicide after approaching him one night and leaving behind a box of material on the case he has been collecting for years. Dept Q's investigation leads away from the young man originally convicted, towards a group of students from a nearby boarding school who became pillars of the Danish establishment.
The existence of department Q is threatened by the success of other departments.

Cast

Release
When it was released in Oct 2014 it was Denmark's highest-grossing opening week for a local film ever.

Fares Fares who plays Assad received the Robert Award (called the "Danish Oscar") for his performance as Best Actor in a Supporting Role. The film also received the Audience Award.

Reception

Critical response
The Absent One holds a 92% approval rating on review aggregator website Rotten Tomatoes, based on 12 reviews.

References

External links
 
 

2014 films
2010s Danish-language films
2010s French-language films
2014 crime thriller films
2010s mystery thriller films
Danish crime thriller films
German crime thriller films
German mystery thriller films
Swedish crime thriller films
Swedish mystery thriller films
Films shot in Denmark
Films shot in Germany
Films shot in Hamburg
Zentropa films
Nordisk Film films
Department Q
2014 multilingual films
Films produced by Peter Aalbæk Jensen
Films produced by Louise Vesth
2010s German films
2010s Swedish films